La Grange is a town in Lenoir County, North Carolina, United States. The population was 2,873 based on the 2010 census. La Grange is located in North Carolina's Inner Banks region.

Geography
La Grange is located at  (35.308583, -77.792118).

History
La Grange was named for the French estate of the Marquis de Lafayette, the Château de la Grange-Bléneau. The Herring House, La Grange Presbyterian Church, and La Grange Historic District are listed on the National Register of Historic Places.

Demographics

2020 census

As of the 2020 United States census, there were 2,595 people, 1,133 households, and 732 families residing in the town.

2000 census
As of the census of 2000, there were 2,844 people, 1,211 households, and 768 families residing in the town. The population density was 1,256.4 people per square mile (485.9/km2). There were 1,330 housing units at an average density of 587.6 per square mile (227.2/km2). The racial makeup of the town was 42.86% White, 55.03% African American, 0.35% Asian, 0.04% Pacific Islander, 0.91% from other races, and 0.81% from two or more races. Hispanic or Latino of any race were 1.30% of the population.

There were 1,211 households, out of which 27.6% had children under the age of 18 living with them, 40.5% were married couples living together, 19.7% had a female householder with no husband present, and 36.5% were non-families. 33.6% of all households were made up of individuals, and 15.2% had someone living alone who was 65 years of age or older. The average household size was 2.35 and the average family size was 3.00.

In the town, the population was spread out, with 23.6% under the age of 18, 8.2% from 18 to 24, 27.7% from 25 to 44, 24.8% from 45 to 64, and 15.8% who were 65 years of age or older. The median age was 39 years. For every 100 females, there were 82.4 males. For every 100 females age 18 and over, there were 76.3 males.

The median income for a household in the town was $28,304, and the median income for a family was $38,068. Males had a median income of $26,581 versus $20,212 for females. The per capita income for the town was $14,436. About 14.4% of families and 19.0% of the population were below the poverty line, including 24.6% of those under age 18 and 15.0% of those age 65 or over.

Education

Schools
La Grange is served by three Public schools which are operated by the Lenoir County Public School system. They include North Lenoir High School, E.B. Frink Middle School and La Grange Elementary School. Higher education is provided through a local branch of Lenoir Community College.

Library
The Neuse Regional Library system is headquartered in Kinston and operates a branch in La Grange.

Transportation

Passenger
 Air: La Grange is served by the nearby Kinston Regional Jetport . Raleigh-Durham International Airport (code RDU) is the closest major airport, with service to more than 45 domestic and international destinations.
 I-95 is the closest Interstate Highway to La Grange and is located 40 miles west of the town.
 The closest Amtrak station is located in Selma.

Roads
 The main highway in La Grange is US 70, which offers access to the North Carolina coast and I-95.
 NC 903 is the other highway that runs through the town.

Local events
The Garden Spot Festival is a yearly event that is held from September 7–9. The event includes live bands, food, and artistic performances.

Notable people
 The Corsairs, Doo-wop quartet consisting of brothers Jay "Bird," James and Moses Uzzell with cousin George Wooten, formed in La Grange. The group is known for its R&B hit "Smoky Places", which peaked at no. 12 on the Billboard pop charts in 1962.
 Frank Lucas, famous drug lord and subject of a 2007 motion picture American Gangster
 Sam Shepherd, Venezuelan Olympic basketball player

References

External links
 Town of La Grange, NC Official Website

Towns in Lenoir County, North Carolina
Towns in North Carolina